Cristo Marrero Henríquez (born 10 November 1978) is a Spanish former footballer who played as a forward.

He spent six seasons in Segunda División with Tenerife, for whom he appeared in 169 competitive matches.

Club career
Born in San Miguel de Abona, Province of Santa Cruz de Tenerife, Marrero started playing football at local club UD Las Zocas, where he stayed for 17 years, never making it past the Tercera División during his four seasons as a senior.

Marrero signed with Canary Islands neighbours CD Tenerife in the summer of 2001, but still went on to spend a further two years with their reserves. He made his Segunda División debut on 31 August 2003 against Deportivo Alavés, and went on to become captain.

After appearing sparingly in the 2008–09 campaign as Tenerife eventually returned to La Liga after seven years (15 games, only one start and 174 minutes of action, one goal scored), Marrero moved teams but stayed in his native region, signing with Universidad de Las Palmas CF from Segunda División B. After two seasons the club folded, and the 32-year-old returned to Las Zocas.

In June 2012, Marrero retired from football and started a coaching career, beginning as an assistant with Tenerife B.

References

External links

1978 births
Living people
People from Tenerife
Sportspeople from the Province of Santa Cruz de Tenerife
Spanish footballers
Footballers from the Canary Islands
Association football forwards
Segunda División players
Segunda División B players
Tercera División players
CD Tenerife B players
CD Tenerife players
Universidad de Las Palmas CF footballers